The 2020–21 Bemidji State Beavers men's ice hockey season was the 65th season of play for the program, the 22nd at the Division I level and the 11th in the WCHA conference. The Beavers represented Bemidji State University and were coached by Tom Serratore, in his 20th season.

Season
As a result of the ongoing COVID-19 pandemic the entire college ice hockey season was delayed. Because the NCAA had previously announced that all winter sports athletes would retain whatever eligibility they possessed through at least the following year, none of Bemidji State's players would lose a season of play. However, the NCAA also approved a change in its transfer regulations that would allow players to transfer and play immediately rather than having to sit out a season, as the rules previously required.

Bemidji State's start to the season was a bit rocky but the team started playing better by the beginning of January and took 3 out of four games from a highly ranked Bowling Green squad. After flirting with a ranking of their own for a few weeks, the Beavers put a string of wins together towards the end of the regular season that placed them firmly in the top-20. The team's performance against the top teams in the WCHA made it possible that BSU would make the NCAA Tournament without a conference title, but sweeping Michigan Tech in the quarterfinals all but guaranteed them a spot.

The Beavers were ranked 13th by the NCAA selection committee and were placed opposite Wisconsin for the first tournament game. The Beavers played well from the start, recording 16 shots and taking an early lead after the first period. After the Badgers cut their lead in half the game tightened up but BSU continued to fire the puck on goal and regained their two-goal lead late in the second. A gaffe by Wisconsin's netminder allowed Owen Sillinger to score the team's 4th goal and the Beavers added another early in the third. Wisconsin fought back to score twice in the final frame but the Beaver's lead was too great and an empty net goal with less than 2 seconds remaining sent Bemidji State to the regional final. The Beaver's performance in their second game was nightmarish for the team. BSU ended up recording just 18 shots all game and were unable to score on any of their six power play opportunities, which included a 5-minute major. To make matters worse, Massachusetts opened the scoring with a short-handed goal and never let the Beavers onto the game, winning the match 4–0.

Austin Jouppi and Nick Leitner sat out the season.

Departures

Recruiting

Roster
As of December 31, 2020.

Standings

Schedule and Results

|-
!colspan=12 style=";" | Regular season

|-
!colspan=12 style=";" | 

|- align="center" bgcolor="#e0e0e0"
|colspan=12|Bemidji State Won Series 2–0

|-
!colspan=12 style=";" |

Scoring statistics

Goaltending statistics

Rankings

USCHO did not release a poll in week 20.

Awards and honors

References

Bemidji State Beavers men's ice hockey seasons
Bemidji State Beavers
Bemidji State Beavers
Bemidji State Beavers
Bemidji State Beavers
Bemidji State Beavers